Mor Athanasios Geevarghese  (born 12 October 1957) is a Syriac Orthodox bishop, currently the Abbot of Mor Ignatius Dayro Manjinikkara & Metropolitan of Simhasana Churches of South Kerala.

Early life
Mor Athanasius Geevarghese was born in the Eralil family of Ayyampilly on 12 October 1957 to Late Mr. G. Korah and Susan Korah.

Education
He has a B.Sc. Physics Degree at St. Alberts College, Kochi and has completed education as a Chartered Accountant from A.A Menon & Associates at Ernakulam.

References

Living people
Syriac Orthodox Church bishops
Indian Oriental Orthodox Christians
People from Ernakulam district
1957 births